Samahang Magdalo (Filipino, "Magdalo Association") is a socio-civic, non-stock, nonprofitable, nationalist organisation based on the Philippines. It is otherwise known as the New Katipunan. Taking inspiration from the struggle of the late 19th century Revolutionary organization, and works for the empowerment of the Filipino people through proper exercise of their rights and sustained vigilance against graft and corruption in government. In 2010, Samahang Magdalo metamorphosed into a full socio-civic entity with programs and activities based on pure initiatives.

The group was formally recognised by the Securities and Exchange Commission on 9 September 2010 in Mandaluyong, Metro Manila. It is registered SEC with Company Registration Number CN201014489 and Company Tax Identification Number (TIN) 007-869-045.

Former Marine Captain Gary Cajolo Alejano from Sipalay, Negros Occidental is the Founding President, while Rajah Danny P, Orfiano serves as the National President.

History

Magdalo Group
When the daring exposé of young military officers and soldiers at Oakwood Premier Hotel on July 27, 2003 fizzled out, the heart of their struggle did not die with it. In fact, with that daring exposé, the dawn of the New Revolutionaries came into being.
The intention of exposing the corruption in government was directed to expose the anomalies so that the poor will be justly served.
When then, Ltsg. Antonio F. Trillanes IV, '(PMA Class ’95) also known as Class “Marilag” made public their grievances against the government, they used the red armed band with a sun emitting sixteen rays.  At the center of the sun is an alibata alphabet “K” signifying that the insignia used was among the first flags of the Katipunan.

Oakwood Mutiny 
It was on July 27, 2003 when some 300 junior officers and soldiers from elite forces of the Armed Forces of the PhilippinesArmed|Armed Forces of the Philippines conglomerated at the Oakwood Premier Hotel. 
Continuing negotiations ensued for 20 hours drawing such dramatic attention in the country. The group, after being satisfied that the objective was finally sent to Filipino people, stood down and surrendered to their superiors. There was no bloodshed and no single shot was ever fired.

  1.Gripping issues at that time
The incarceration of the Magdalo Group did not halt the ideas they have sown. During the Oakwood Incident, they have warned the public about the filth in the government.
In the months to come the warnings came into light with the sprouting of the following issues:
 Massive Cheating in the May 2004 Presidential Elections
 The Jose Pidal account
 The Plunder of Major General Carlos Garcia
 The unexplained wealth of PAGCOR Chairman Efraim Genuino
 The most expensive road in the world, the Macapagal Highway  and so much more.
Meanwhile, as soldiers confront the war in Mindanao, some enterprising individuals are doing pilferages of the Armed Forces ammunitions. Worse, these are being sent to enemy rebels. A case of government’s arm used to kill a government soldier. All these incidents concretized the moral fiber of the Magdalo Group. The support of the public slowly calibrates to a high gear as days pass by. The issues brought to light, what the group had been saying all along. The unfolding drama was given more taste when in June 2005 the “Hello Garci” Scandal surfaced. It reaffirmed the theory that Gloria Macapagal Arroyo at the instance of the COMELEC cheated her closest rival Fernando Poe Jr. to win the 2004 Presidential Election.

In the most disdainful act ever done by a President, Gloria Macapagal Arroyo appeared in a national television issuing a statement by airing her apology. She admitted the charged that she called on the COMELEC official, an act that is prohibited by law. Despite this, the President was not prosecuted for the crime and her impeachment was railroaded in Congress in her favor.
     2. Defender of the people
On February 24, 2006 then General Generoso Senga of CSAFP put on house arrest a Brigadier General, in connection with the protest action that was happening. On the other hand Colonel Ariel Querubin, a bemedalled member of the Philippine Marines and a war veteran in Mindanao aired his grievances against the administration. This was done as a continuation of February 24 rallies. He did his airing on February 26. He led a battalion of Marine officers and soldiers in a stand-off inside the Philippine Marine Headquarters In Fort Bonifacio, Makati.

3. More scandals and maneuvers
The month of September in 2007 was just one of another moment in which the administration of Gloria Macapagal Arroyo compromised the welfare of the country. The NBN-ZTE deal was a ridiculous anomaly that designed the stashing of Billions of money from the coffers of government. Romulo Neri, the chief economic planner of Gloria Macapagal Arroyo unwittingly leaked the information that he was offered a P200 Million bribe by COMELEC Chairman Benjamin Abalos. On October 19, Glorietta was bombed leaving 11 persons dead. The analysis of Magdalo group then was that the bombing was made to deflect the attention of the public from the senate investigation done at that time.

Manila Peninsula Incident 

On November 29, 2007, Senator Antonio Trillanes IV and the Magdalo Group marched off their Makati court hearing and went to Manila Peninsula Hotel. It was a sign of protest which was participated by former Vice-President Teofisto Guingona.

About the Organization 

On July 27, 2003, at the Oakwood Premier Hotel, the  group of soldiers  who massed in protest of the excesses of the government then has no name of its own. They were only men drawn into action due to the massive corruption in government at that time. They simply felt that it was their bounden duty to expose the anomalies of the government and call upon the people to respond to the signs of time. At the time of historic protest, the media broke the name “Magdalo” due to the red armed band marked with a Baybayin letter “K” that closely resembles Aguinnaldo's war banner – the Magdalo faction flag. Thereafter, they were labeled by the media as “Magdalo”.

Before the Oakwood Incident in 2003, the recruitment within the ranks of select soldiers were marked by acts and proceedings similar to that of Andres Bonifacio's Katipunan. A pledge of loyalty was made by signing a document with one's blood; the precepts in the Kartilya were adopted; and the ideals of Bonifacio's time were relived.

Andres Bonifacio founded the Katipunan. Historians were drawn to debates on the prominence of Bonifacio in history and everyone agrees that he founded the Katipunan. Even those who are staunch defenders of Emilio Aguinaldo accept  that Bonifacio was Katipunan's founder. History has it on record that Emilio Aguinaldo was the personal recruit of Andres Bonifacio. The latter inducted him into membership personally. The name Magdalo was approved by Bonifacio to be used under Aguinaldo's leadership and therefore it is only proper to say that Aguinaldo accepts the ascendancy of Bonifacio being his Commander- in-Chief. Magdalo is a Katipunan organization beholden to Andres Bonifacio prior to the organization of the First Philippine Republic installed by the Malolos Constitution.

References

Organizations established in 2008